The Devil All the Time is the debut novel by American writer Donald Ray Pollock, published in 2011 by Doubleday. Its plot follows disparate characters in post-World War II Southern Ohio and West Virginia, including a disturbed war veteran, a husband and wife who are serial killers, and a false preacher. A film adaptation of the same name directed by Antonio Campos and narrated by Pollock, starred Tom Holland, Sebastian Stan, Robert Pattinson and Bill Skarsgård, and was produced by Jake Gyllenhaal.

Plot

The Devil All the Time follows the events and fates of various characters who all carry their own secrets from the past. As the novel progresses the lives of these people converge in unexpected ways.

In a prologue, Pollock introduces the protagonist, Arvin, as a young boy. He sits in a clearing with his father, Willard, on an oak log, joining him in his evening prayer routine. Willard is borderline obsessive when it comes to prayer and expects the same from his son. While Arvin prays, however, his mind wanders and feelings of isolation bubble to the surface. Feeling like an outsider at school, he is the victim of relentless bullying. Arvin recalls his father telling him to stand up for himself, but this is easier said than done.

The rest of the book is divided into seven parts. Part One, "Sacrifice," begins in 1945, before the prologue. Willard is a young single man who has just been discharged from combat duty after the end of World War II. As he sits on a bus headed to his home in Coal Creek, West Virginia, he recalls the horrifying things he saw and did during the war. One memory haunts him in particular: that of a soldier he comes across who has been skinned and crucified. Willard shoots the man as an act of mercy, putting an end to his suffering. The bus makes a stop at the Wooden Spoon Diner in Meade, Ohio. There, Willard meets and instantly falls in love with a beautiful waitress, Charlotte Willoughby. At home, he is met by his nervous and emotionally-damaged mother, Emma, and her brother, Uncle Earskell. Willard proceeds to get drunk, and his thoughts turn from the horrors of war to the beautiful waitress he just met. He lets it slip to his mother that he has fallen in love, which upsets her because she made a bargain with God that if He let her son live, she would arrange a marriage between Willard and poor Helen Hatton.

At church one evening, we meet Brother Roy and Brother Theodore, Roy’s fat and crippled cousin. They preach about letting God cure you of your worst fears and Roy dumps a bin full of spiders on his head, scarring almost everyone in the chapel. Helen takes a liking to Roy and they later have a daughter named Lenora.

Feeling his connection with God lessen, Roy decides that in order to regain his bond he must crucify something and raise it from the dead. Theodore, who hates Helen for taking Roy’s attention, convinces Roy to kill her for the sacrifice. They take her out to a field and Roy stabs her in the neck with a screwdriver. As expected, Roy is unable to raise her from the dead and they flee the town, leaving Lenora with Emma (Willard's mother).

Linking back up with other characters, Willard marries Charlotte and together they have a son whom they name Arvin. As the years pass, Willard becomes obsessed with prayer. The obsession only deepens when Charlotte is diagnosed with cancer. Willard's rituals become progressively more bizarre and upsetting, culminating in animal and even human sacrifice. Willard believes these acts of devotion are necessary to save his wife. Nevertheless, in the end, Charlotte still dies, prompting Willard to commit suicide. Traumatized by his parents' deaths and his father's behavior, Arvin lives with his grandmother, Emma. There, he meets Lenora, an orphan girl whom Emma takes in after her mother, Helen, is killed, the prime suspects in everyone’s mind being the traveling preacher named Roy who is also Lenora's father.

In Part 2, "On the Hunt," the reader is introduced to Carl and Sandy Henderson, a pair of murderous lowlifes living in Meade who entertain themselves by picking up male hitchhikers and killing them. Their reign of terror is allowed to persist in part because Sandy's brother, Sheriff Bodecker, is corrupt and incompetent. An unemployed photographer, Carl takes pictures of his victims, calling them models. In one exceedingly depraved image, Carl takes a photograph of Sandy holding the severed head of one of their victims in her arms as if it were a baby. It is Carl's favorite photo.

In Part 3, "Orphans and Ghosts," Arvin and Lenora grow up and become very close. Arvin gets his father's gun on his 15th birthday and immediately is drawn to it. When Lenora is bullied at school, Arvin comes to her defense, fighting the bullies in a very brutal and malicious way. His great uncle decides it’s best to put the gun away for a little while. The book also repeatedly drops in on Carl and Sandy.

Part 4, "Winter," focuses largely on Carl and Sandy's murderous exploits.

In Part 5, "Preacher," we learn more about Roy, the traveling preacher who killed Lenora's mother. Roy lives with his physically disabled cousin, Theodore. After moving on from the Coal Creek Church of the Holy Ghost Sanctified, Roy is replaced by a new preacher, Pastor Teagardin, who lives with his much younger wife, Cynthia. Lenora believes Teagardin to be an exceptionally holy man, but Arvin has his doubts. These suspicions are validated when the reader learns of Teagardin's seduction and sexual corruption of Cynthia. Teagardin then successfully seduces Lenora, getting the young girl pregnant. When Lenora confronts Teagardin about the pregnancy he denies his part in it, asking her who the townsfolk would believe: her, or their Preacher? With seemingly nowhere else to turn, Lenora commits suicide. Furious after putting the pieces of the story together, Arvin shoots Teagardin dead and flees Coal Creek.

After Part 6, "Serpents," which follows more of Carl's and Sandy's depraved, murderous rampage, the storylines of the major characters converge in the final section, titled "Ohio." In the wake of Theodore's death, a repentant Roy returns to Appalachia to track down and apologize to Lenora, who has since died. Unfortunately, he encounters Carl and Sandy who make Roy their latest victim. Later, Carl and Sandy happen to pick up Arvin, but after they attack him, Arvin gets the upper hand and shoots both of them dead. Sheriff Bodecker pursues Arvin, and they end up in a standoff in the same clearing where Willard performed sacrifices. Arvin kills Bodecker and walks down the highway, full of hope for the first time in a long while.

Reception
Writing for The New York Times, Josh Ritter praised the novel, describing its prose as "sickly beautiful as it is hard-boiled. [Pollock]'s scenes have a rare and unsettling ability to make the reader woozy, the ends of the chapters flicking like black horseflies off the page." Lisa Shea of Elle wrote that the "flawless cadence of Pollock's gorgeous shadow-and-light prose plays against the heinous acts of his sorrowful and sometimes just sorry characters." Carolyn Kellogg of the Los Angeles Times praised Pollock's narrative method, writing that he "deftly shifts from one perspective to another, without any clunky transitions – the prose just moves without signal or stumble, opening up the story in new ways again and again...  The Devil All the Time should cement his reputation as a significant voice in American fiction."

Jeff Baker of The Oregonian noted that the novel "reads as if the love child of [Flannery] O'Connor and [William] Faulkner was captured by Cormac McCarthy, kept in a cage out back and forced to consume nothing but onion rings, Oxycontin and Terrence Malick's Badlands." Publishers Weekly commented "If Pollock's powerful collection Knockemstiff was a punch to the jaw, his follow-up, a novel set in the violent soul-numbing towns of southern Ohio and West Virginia, feels closer to a mule's kick, and how he draws these folks and their inevitably hopeless lives without pity is what the kick's all about."

The French literary publication Lire named The Devil All the Time as the best novel of the year in 2012.

Accolades
Won2012 Grand Prix de Littérature Policière
Won2012 Prix du Livre de l'Année (Magazine Lire)
Won2012 Thomas and Lillie D. Chaffin Award for Appalachian Writing (2012)
2013 Deutscher Krimi Preis 
Won2013 Prix Mystère de la critique

Adaptation

The novel was adapted into a feature film of the same name by director Antonio Campos, released on Netflix. Filming began in Alabama on February 19, 2019 and concluded on April 15, 2019. It was released on September 16, 2020.

References

2011 American novels
American crime novels
American novels adapted into films
Books critical of religion
Doubleday (publisher) books
Grand Prix de Littérature Policière winners
Novels about religion
Novels about serial killers
Novels set in the 1940s
Novels set in Ohio
Novels set in West Virginia
Southern Gothic novels
2011 debut novels